Farmer is an unincorporated community in central Farmer Township, Defiance County, Ohio, United States. It has a post office with the ZIP code 43520. It is located at the intersection of State Routes 2 and 249.

History
Farmer was named for Nathaniel Farmer, an early settler.

Notable
Abe L. Biglow, businessman, educator, and member of the Wisconsin State Assembly
William P. Richardson, co-founder and first Dean of Brooklyn Law School

References

Unincorporated communities in Ohio
Unincorporated communities in Defiance County, Ohio